Hatgachha is a census town in Sankrail CD Block of Howrah Sadar subdivision in Howrah district in the Indian state of West Bengal. It is a part of Kolkata Urban Agglomeration.

Geography

Demographics
As per 2011 Census of India Hatgachha had a total population of 5,980 of which 3,086 (52%) were males and 2,894 (48%) were females. Population below 6 years was 558. The total number of literates in Hatgachha was 4,842 (89.30% of the population over 6 years).

Hatgachha was part of Kolkata Urban Agglomeration in 2011 census.

 India census, Hatgachha had a population of 5560. Males constitute 53% of the population and females 47%. Hatgachha has an average literacy rate of 80%, higher than the national average of 59.5%: male literacy is 84% and female literacy is 75%. In Hatgachha, 9% of the population is under 6 years of age.

Transport
Satyen Bose Road is the artery of the town.

Bus

Private Bus
 69 Sankrail railway station - Howrah Station

Mini Bus
 24 Sankrail railway station - Howrah Station

Bus Routes Without Numbers
 Sankrail railway station - New Town Shapoorji Housing Estate
 Sarenga (Kolatala More) - New Town Unitech

Train
Andul railway station on Howrah-Kharagpur line is the nearest railway station.

References

Cities and towns in Howrah district
Neighbourhoods in Kolkata
Kolkata Metropolitan Area